Pongal, also referred to as Thai Pongal, is a multi-day Hindu harvest festival celebrated by Tamils in India and Sri Lanka. It is observed at the start of the month Thai according to Tamil solar calendar, and this festival is celebrated usually on January 14  or January 15 depending on the sun's orbit around earth that particular year. It is dedicated to the sun god, Surya, and corresponds to Makar Sankranti, the harvest festival under many regional names celebrated throughout India. The three days of the Pongal festival are called Bhogi Pongal, Surya Pongal, and Mattu Pongal. Some Tamils celebrate a fourth day of Pongal known as Kanum Pongal.

According to tradition, the festival marks the end of winter solstice, and the start of the sun's six-month-long journey northwards when the sun enters the Capricorn, also called as Uttarayana. The festival is named after the ceremonial "Pongal", which means "to boil, overflow" and refers to the traditional dish prepared from the new harvest of rice boiled in milk with jaggery (raw sugar). To mark the festival, the pongal dish is prepared, first offered to the gods and goddesses, including Surya. Mattu Pongal is for worship of the cow known as Madu. Cattle are bathed, their horns polished and painted in bright colors, and garlands of flowers placed around their necks. The pongal that has been offered to the deities is then given to cattle , and then shared by the family. Festive celebrations include decorating cows and their horns, ritual bathing and processions. It is traditionally an occasion for decorating rice-powder based kolam artworks, offering prayers in the home, temples, getting together with family and friends, and exchanging gifts to renew social bonds of solidarity.

Pongal is one of the most important festivals celebrated by Tamil people in Tamil Nadu, Karnataka, Kerala, and Andhra Pradesh, Telangana and Puducherry in India. It is also a major Tamil festival in Sri Lanka. It is observed by the Tamil diaspora worldwide, including those in Malaysia, Mauritius, South Africa, Singapore, United States, United Kingdom, Canada, and the Gulf countries.

Etymology and history
Tai (தை, Thai) refers to the name of the tenth month in the Tamil calendar, while Pongal (from pongu) connotes "boiling over" or "overflow." Pongal is also the name of a sweetened dish of rice boiled in milk and jaggery that is ritually consumed on this day.

The principal theme of Pongal is thanking the Sun god, the forces of nature, and the farm animals and people who support agriculture. The Pongal festival is mentioned in an inscription in the Viraraghava temple dedicated to Vishnu (in Thiruvallur). Credited to the Chola king Kulottunga I (1070–1122 CE), the inscription describes a grant of land to the temple for celebrating the annual Pongal festivities. Similarly, the 9th-century Shiva bhakti text Tiruvembavai by Manikkavachakar vividly mentions the festival. However, there is no evidence in the holy scriptures for celebrating Pongal.

According to Andrea Gutiérrez – a scholar of Sanskrit and Tamil traditions, the history of the Pongal dish in festive and religious context can be traced to at least the Chola period. It appears in numerous texts and inscriptions with variant spellings. In early records, it appears as ponakam, tiruponakam, ponkal and similar terms. Some of the major temple inscriptions from Chola Dynasty to Vijayanagara Empire periods include detailed recipe which are essentially the same as the pongal recipes of the modern era, but for the variations in seasonings and relative amounts of the ingredients. Further, the terms ponakam, ponkal and its prefixed variants have meant either the festive pongal dish by itself as prasadam, or the pongal dish as part of entire thali (now alankara naivedya). These were a part of the charitable grants received and served by free community kitchens in Tamil, Karnataka and Andhra Pradesh Hindu temples either as festival food or to pilgrims every day.

Pongal dish

The festival's most significant practice is the preparation of the traditional "pongal" dish. It utilizes freshly harvested rice, and is prepared by boiling it in milk and raw cane sugar (jaggery). Sometimes additional ingredients are added to the sweet dish, such as: cardamom, raisins, Green gram (split), and cashew nuts. Other ingredients include coconut and ghee (clarified butter from cow milk). Along with the sweet version of the Pongal dish, some prepare other versions such as salty and savoury (venpongal). In some communities, women take their "cooking pots to the town center, or the main square, or near a temple of their choice or simply in front of their own home" and cook together as a social event, states Gutiérrez. The cooking is done in sunlight, usually in a porch or courtyard, as the dish is dedicated to the Sun god, Surya. Relatives and friends are invited, and the standard greeting on the Pongal day typically is, "has the rice boiled"?

The cooking is done in a clay pot that is often garlanded with leaves or flowers, sometimes tied with a piece of turmeric root or marked with pattern artwork called kolam. It is either cooked at home, or in community gatherings such as in temples or village open spaces. It is the ritual dish, along with many other courses prepared from seasonal foods for all present. It is traditionally offered to the gods and goddesses first, followed sometimes by cows, then to friends and family gathered. Temples and communities organize free kitchen prepared by volunteers to all those who gather. According to Andre Bateille, this tradition is a means to renew social bonds. Portions of the sweet pongal dish (sakkara pongal) are distributed as the prasadam in Hindu temples.

The dish and the process of its preparation is a part of the symbolism, both conceptually and materially. It celebrates the harvest, the cooking transforms the gift of agriculture into nourishment for the gods and the community on a day that Tamil's traditionally believe marks the end of winter solstice and starts the sun god's journey north. The blessing of abundance by Goddess Pongal (Uma, Parvati) is symbolically marked by the dish "boiling over".

Days of the festival 

The festival is observed for three or four days in Tamil Nadu, but one or two days in urban locations particularly in the Tamil diaspora outside South Asia.

Bhogi Pongal 
The Pongal festival begins on the day called Bhogi Pongal, and it marks the last day of the Tamil month Marghali. On this day people discard old belongings and celebrate new possessions. The people assemble and light a bonfire in order to burn the heaps of discards. Houses are cleaned, painted and decorated to give a festive look. The horns of oxen and buffaloes are painted in villages. New clothes are worn to mark the start of the festival. The deity of the day is Indra – the god of rains, to whom prayers are offered, with thanks and hopes for plentiful rains in the year ahead.

Bhogi is also observed on the same day in Karnataka and Andhra Pradesh. In the ceremony called Bhogi Pallu, fruits of the harvest such as regi pallu and sugar cane are collected along with flowers of the season. Money is often placed into a mixture of treats and is poured over children.  The children then separate and collect the money and sweet fruits.

Surya Pongal 

Surya Pongal – also called Suryan Pongal or Perum Pongal – is the second and main festive day, and is dedicated to the sun god. It is the first day of the Tamil calendar month Tai, and coincides with Makara Sankranthi – a winter harvest festival celebrated throughout India. The day marks the start of the Uttarayana, when the sun enters the 10th house of the zodiac Makara (Capricorn). The day is celebrated with family and friends, with the Pongal dish prepared in a traditional earthen pot in an open space in the view of the sun. The pot is typically decorated by tying a turmeric plant or flower garland, and near the cooking stove are placed two or more tall fresh sugarcane stalks.

The pongal dish is traditionally prepared by boiling milk, in a group setting. When it starts to bubble, freshly harvested rice grains and cane sugar are added to the pot. As the dish begins to boil and overflow out of the vessel, one or more participants blow a conch called the sanggu while others shout with joy "Pongalo Pongal"! – lit. "may this rice boil over". This is symbolism for the shared wish of greater fortunes in the year ahead. In rural settings, the gathered women or neighbors sing "kuruvai trills" (traditional songs) while the pongal dish is cooking. The dish is offered to the gods and goddesses, sometimes to the village cows, and then shared by the community. Men traditionally offer prayers to the sun with the ''vanakkam'' posture in open, and then proceed to eat their meal. According to James Lochtefeld, the Pongal dish is first offered to Surya and Ganesha, and then shared with the gathered friends and family.

Tamils decorate their homes with banana and mango leaves and embellish the entrance space before homes, corridors or doors with decorative floral, festive or geometric patterns drawn using colored rice flour. These are called kolams.

Mattu Pongal 

Mattu Pongal is celebrated the day after Surya Pongal. Mattu refers to "cow, bullock, cattle", and Tamil people irrespective of religion, regard cattle as sources of wealth for providing dairy products, fertilizer, transportation and agricultural aid. On Mattu Pongal, cattle are decorated – sometimes with flower garlands or painted horns, they are offered bananas, a special meal and worshipped. Some decorate their cows with manjalthanni (turmeric water) and oil. Shikakai apply kungumam (kumkum) to their foreheads,  paint their horns, and feed them a mixture of venn pongal, jaggery, honey, banana and other fruits. Others bathe their cattle and prostrate before them with words of thanks for the help with the harvest.

In cities, the day marks the ritual visit to nearby temples and prayers there. Temples and communities hold processions by parading icons from the sanctum of the temple in wooden chariots, drama-dance performances encouraging social gatherings and renewal of community bonds. Other events during Pongal include community sports and games such as cattle race, the Jallikattu. The major cultural festivals on Pongal occur near Madurai.

Kanum Pongal 

Kanum Pongal, sometimes called the Kanu Pongal, the fourth day of the festival, marks the end of Pongal festivities for the year. The word kanum (kaanum) in this context means "to visit."  Many families hold reunions on this day. Communities organize social events to strengthen mutual bonds. Villagers cut and consume farm fresh sugarcane during social gatherings. Relatives, friends and neighbors visit to greet, while youngsters go out to meet seniors among the relatives and neighborhoods to pay respects and seek blessings, while some elders give the visiting children some pocket change as a gift.

Kanu Pidi is a tradition observed on Mattu Pongal by women and young girls. They place a leaf of turmeric plant outside their home, and feed the leftover pongal dish and food from Surya Pongal to the birds, particularly crow. They pray for their brothers' well being, in a manner similar to Bhaiya dooj in north India. Brothers pay special tribute to their married sisters by giving gifts as affirmation of their filial love.

Pongala in Kerala
In Kerala – a state that shares historic cultural overlap with Tamils through Chera dynasty according to Sangam literature, the festival is called Pongala. The rituals including the cooking of milk-rice-jaggery dish, social visits, and the reverence for cattle is observed in Kerala communities. It is observed on the same day as Tamil Pongal, and is a limited state holiday in the districts of Wayanad, Idukki, Pathanamthitta, Palakkad, and Thiruvananthapuram.

Of particular note is the largest pilgrimage and annual gathering of women to the Attukal Bhagavati Temple near Thiruvanathapuram (Kerala). The Pongala festival falls according to the Malayalam calendar, in the month of Makaram-Kumbham (February–March). They gather and stay in the streets, town people host and help with the supplies, they cook together and offer the Pongala dish to the Hindu temple goddess Bhagavati (Parvati, or Durga-Kannaki). Free food is distributed to everyone on the streets.

While the Attukal Pongala pilgrimage and festival has roots in Tamil culture and temples, it attracts participation from women from other religions. The Attukal Pongala has been recognized by the Guinness Book of World Records as the largest gathering of women in the world, featuring an estimated 2.5 million women. The celebrations include dance (Kathakali) and musical performances by boys and girls, as well as major processions featuring the temple goddess.

Community Pongal

Community Pongal is an event where families gather at ceremonial worship. It becomes an important part of the worship, starting from selecting the pot, igniting the fire and other steps. Sugarcane sticks, bananas and coconuts are also offered.

Contemporary practices and related festivals

The Pongal festival maybe viewed more as a "social festival" since the contemporary celebrations do not necessarily link it to temple rituals. Temples and cultural centers organize the ritual cooking of Pongal dish, along with fairs (Pongal mela) with handicrafts, crafts, pottery, sarees, ethnic jewelry for sale. These sites hold traditional community sports such as Uri Adithal ("breaking a hanging mud pot while blindfolded"), Pallanguḻi and Kabbadi, as well as group dance and music performances in major cities and towns.

In Karnataka, the festival days are similar, except the dish is called "Ellu". Decorations and social visits are also common in many parts of Karnataka.

This day coincides with Makara Sankranthi, and Maghi (day after Lohri). It is celebrated in many parts of India, Nepal and Bangladesh.

Outside India
The festival is observed by the Tamil diaspora worldwide, including those in Malaysia, Mauritius, the Persian Gulf, Australia, New Zealand, South Africa, Singapore, United States, United Kingdom, and Canada. In 2017, Delegate David Bulova introduced a joint resolution HJ573 in the Virginia House of Delegates to designate January 14 of each year as Pongal Day.

See also
 Makar Sankranti
 Vaisakhi
 List of Harvest Festivals

References

External links

Pongal, University of Iowa
Pongal (Sankranti), South Dakota State University
Pongal, Little India, Singapore
Sri Lanka - Pongal, SCFI

Tamil festivals
January observances
Food and drink festivals in India
Festivals in Tamil Nadu
Festivals in India
Hindu festivals
Harvest festivals
Harvest festivals in India
Hindu festivals in India